Nogushi (Nögöş) is a rural locality (a selo) and the administrative centre of Nogushinsky Selsoviet, Belokataysky District, Bashkortostan, Russia. The population was 628 as of 2010. There are 12 streets.

Geography 
Nogushi is located 44 km northwest of Novobelokatay (the district's administrative centre) by road. Karlykhanovo is the nearest rural locality.

References 

Rural localities in Belokataysky District